Abbiati is a surname, from the Lombardy region (suffix -ati), found in Milan. Notable people with the surname include:

Christian Abbiati (born 1977), Italian former professional footballer
Filippo Abbiati (1640–1715), Italian painter of Baroque style
Francesco Maria Abbiati (died 1650), Roman Catholic prelate 
Franco Abbiati (1898–1981), Italian musicologist
Giuseppe Abbiati, Italian engraver
Paolo Maria Abbiati (17th century), Italian engraver

See also
Abbiategrasso, a comune in the province of Milan

Italian-language surnames